Applegate Valley is the valley of the Applegate River in Southern Oregon, United States and extending slightly into Northern California. Oregon Route 238 (Jacksonville Highway) is a main route through the valley.

Many wineries of the Applegate Valley AVA (American Viticultural Area), a sub-appellation of the Rogue Valley AVA, are located in the valley.

The area is also a well known medical marijuana growing region.

See also
 Applegate, Oregon
 Ruch, Oregon

External links 
 Applegate Valley Fire Plan: USDA

Landforms of Siskiyou County, California
Valleys of Oregon
Landforms of Jackson County, Oregon
Landforms of Josephine County, Oregon